KZKX (96.9 FM) is a radio station broadcasting a country music format. Licensed to Seward, Nebraska, United States, the station serves the Lincoln area.  The station is currently owned by Alpha Media. Studios are located on Cornhusker Highway in Northeast Lincoln, while its transmitter is located near Valparaiso.

References

External links

ZKX